EveryCat Health Foundation, formerly the Winn Feline Foundation, is a non-profit organization headquartered in Wyckoff, New Jersey. The organization provides funds for cat-related health research and education. The foundation has co-produced a film; Aeris, by Paul Castro Jr. and Aly Miller, and hosted the premiere on November 3, 2017, at the Lincoln Center in New York City.

References

External links

Domestic cat welfare organizations
Non-profit organizations based in New Jersey
Organizations established in 1968